Baileya is a genus of moths of the family Nolidae. The genus was erected by Augustus Radcliffe Grote in 1895.

Species
 Baileya acadiana Brou, 2004
 Baileya aphanes Dyar, 1920
 Baileya australis (Grote, 1881)
 Baileya dormitans (Guenée, 1852)
 Baileya doubledayi (Guenée, 1852)
 Baileya ellessyoo Brou, 2004
 Baileya levitans (Smith, 1906)
 Baileya ophthalmica (Guenée, 1852)
 Baileya restitans Dyar, 1913

References

Nolidae